Interstate 380 (I-380) is a short  east–west auxiliary Interstate Highway in the San Francisco Bay Area of Northern California, connecting I-280 in San Bruno to US Route 101 (US 101) near San Francisco International Airport. The highway primarily consists of only three intersections: I-280, State Route 82 (SR 82/El Camino Real), and US 101. Like the nearby I-280, I-380 never connects to I-80, its parent Interstate Highway. However, there is no rule that says that spur routes need to. (Similarly, the spur route I-795 branches off from I-695, a beltway around Baltimore, and is only indirectly linked to I-95.)

I-380 is officially known as the Quentin L. Kopp Freeway, named after the prominent California state senator from San Mateo County. This highway was previously named the Portola Freeway to honor the 18th-century Spanish explorer Gaspar de Portolá, whose expedition in 1769–1770 discovered the San Francisco Bay, from a viewpoint on the Sweeney Ridge located between San Bruno and Pacifica.

Route description

I-380 begins at a junction with I-280 in San Bruno. This junction was only partially built, with room to accommodate a proposed freeway extension west toward SR 1. The freeway itself lacks overhead guide signs mentioning I-380. It then travels east through the city of San Bruno, intersecting with SR 82 (El Camino Real) before reaching US 101.

At its terminus at US 101, the mainline lanes of I-380 continue to North Access Road. The ramps to and from southbound US 101 provide connections to collector–distributor roads leading directly to San Francisco International Airport, allowing traffic between the Interstate and the airport to avoid merging with the main traffic lanes of US 101.

I-380 is part of the California Freeway and Expressway System and is part of the National Highway System, a network of highways that are considered essential to the country's economy, defense, and mobility by the Federal Highway Administration (FHWA).

History
There were plans to extend I-380 west to SR 1 (Cabrillo Highway), but, due to the route's passing over the San Andreas Fault and opposition from members of the local community, this project was abandoned. The westbound lanes of I-380 branch off to the right at I-280, leaving a wide, paved space which would carry the freeway extension under I-280 toward SR 1. This space is currently often used as storage space for equipment used in highway maintenance. A pair of unused bridges crossing over the I-280 south to I-380 east offramp remain as evidence.  

Chapter 2, Article 3, Section 608 of the California Streets and Highways Code legally defines Route 380 as traveling from "Route 1 near Pacifica to Route 280 in San Bruno", and the exit numbers assigned at I-280 start at 5 instead of 1 or 0.

Exit list
Under the official exit list by Caltrans, mileage is measured from the unconstructed western terminus at SR 1 near Pacifica. It starts at the location of the SR 82 interchange, labeling the start of the I-280 ramps at that same point.

See also

References

External links

Interstate 380 @ California Highways
Interstate 380 @ AARoads.com
Caltrans: Route 380 highway conditions
Map of 1974 plan to extend the freeway to the west

3 California
80-3
380
80-3 California
Interstate 80-3